RC Posnania is a Polish rugby union club based in Poznań, Poland. It was founded in 1906 as a sport club. In 1956 the rugby union team was created.

Honours
 Rugby Ekstraliga
 Runners-up: 1962
 Polish Cup:
 Winner:(1): 1974

See also
Rugby union in Poland
Rugby Ekstraliga

External links 
 

Polish rugby union teams
Sport in Poznań